Declaration of Independence Tablet is a 1925 sculpture by John Francis Paramino, installed at Boston Common, in Boston, Massachusetts, United States.

Description and history
The bronze tablet is a copy of John Trumbull's 1818 Declaration of Independence painting, set into a granite block with an eagle carved at the top. The work was cleaned, colored, and recoated in 1988, and was surveyed as part of the Smithsonian Institution's "Save Outdoor Sculpture!" program in 1993.

See also

 1925 in art
 Founding Fathers of the United States

References

External links
 

1925 establishments in Massachusetts
1925 sculptures
Boston Common
Bronze sculptures in Massachusetts
Granite sculptures in Massachusetts
Monuments and memorials in Boston
Outdoor sculptures in Boston
Sculptures of birds in the United States
United States Declaration of Independence in art